Stonemyia californica is a species of fly in the family Tabanidae.

Distribution
Canada, United States, Mexico.

References

Tabanidae
Insects described in 1892
Diptera of North America
Taxa named by Jacques-Marie-Frangile Bigot